The Saint Joseph's Hawks women's basketball team represents Saint Joseph's University, Philadelphia, Pennsylvania. The program is classified in the NCAA's Division I, and the team competes in the Atlantic 10 Conference.

History
St. Joseph's began play in 1973. The Hawks have made 22 appearances in the postseason, appearing in the NCAA Tournament 13 times, (1985, 1986, 1987, 1988, 1989, 1990, 1994, 1995, 1997, 1999, 2000, 2013, 2014) and the WNIT ten times (1998, 2002, 2003, 2004, 2006, 2007, 2010, 2011, 2012, 2017). They made the Second Round of the NCAA Tournament in 1987, 1988, 1989, 1997, 1999, 2000, 2014. They have made the Second Round of the WNIT in 1998, 2002, 2003, 2004, 2011, 2012) and the Quarterfinals in 2004. They also participated in the AIAW Eastern Regionals, finishing 3rd in 1976, Sixth in 1977, Third in 1978, and losing in the First Round in 1979.

The Hawks have won the A-10 regular season title in 1985 (shared), 1989, 1990, 1997 (East), 1999 (East), 2000 (East), 2002 (East), and 2003 (East). They have won the A-10 Tournament in 1997, 1999, and 2013, while finishing as runner up in 1987, 1988, 1990, 1991, 1993, 2002, 2004, and 2007. As of the end of the 2015–16 season, the Hawks have an all-time record of 805–434.

Postseason results

NCAA Division I

AIAW Division I
The Hawks made one appearance in the AIAW National Division I basketball tournament, with a combined record of 1–2.

References

External links